In mathematical physics, the Berezin integral, named after Felix Berezin, (also known as Grassmann integral, after Hermann Grassmann), is a way to define integration for functions of Grassmann variables (elements of the exterior algebra). It is not an integral in the Lebesgue sense; the word "integral" is used because the Berezin integral has properties analogous to the Lebesgue integral and because it extends the path integral in physics, where it is used as a sum over histories for fermions.

Definition

Let  be the exterior algebra of polynomials in anticommuting elements  over the field of complex numbers. (The ordering of the generators  is fixed and defines the orientation of the exterior algebra.)

One variable
The Berezin integral over the sole Grassmann variable  is defined to be a linear functional

 

where we define

 

so that :

 

These properties define the integral uniquely and imply

 

Take note that  is the most general function of  because Grassmann variables square to zero, so  cannot have non-zero terms beyond linear order.

Multiple variables

for any  where  means the left or the right partial derivative. These properties define the integral uniquely.

Notice that different conventions exist in the literature: Some authors define instead 

The formula

expresses the Fubini law. On the right-hand side, the interior integral of a monomial  is set to be  where ; the integral of  vanishes.

Change of Grassmann variables

Let  be odd polynomials in some antisymmetric variables . The Jacobian is the matrix

where  refers to the right derivative. The formula for the coordinate change reads

Integrating even and odd variables

Definition

Consider now the algebra  of functions of real commuting variables  and of anticommuting variables  (which is called the free superalgebra of dimension ). Intuitively, a function  is a function of m even (bosonic, commuting) variables and of n odd (fermionic, anti-commuting) variables. More formally, an element  is a function of the argument  that varies in an open set  with values in the algebra  Suppose that this function is continuous and vanishes in the complement of a compact set  The Berezin integral is the number

Change of even and odd variables

where each even derivative  commutes with all elements of the algebra ; the odd derivatives commute with even elements and anticommute with odd elements.

We now need the Berezinian (or superdeterminant) of the matrix , which is the even function

where the Taylor series is finite.

Useful formulas 

The following formulas for Gaussian integrals are used often in the path integral formulation of quantum field theory:

 

with  being a complex  matrix.

 

In the above formulas the notation  is used. From these formulas, other useful formulas follow (See Appendix A in) :

with  being an invertible  matrix. Note that these integrals are all in the form of a partition function.

History

The mathematical theory of the integral with commuting and anticommuting variables was invented and developed by Felix Berezin. Some important earlier insights were made by David John Candlin in 1956. Other authors contributed to these developments, including the physicists Khalatnikov (although his paper contains mistakes), Matthews and Salam, and Martin.

See also
 Supermanifold
 Berezinian

References

Further reading
 Theodore Voronov: Geometric integration theory on Supermanifolds, Harwood Academic Publisher, 
 Berezin, Felix Alexandrovich: Introduction to Superanalysis, Springer Netherlands, 

Multilinear algebra
Differential forms
Integral calculus
Mathematical physics
Quantum field theory
Supersymmetry